Indian Valley High School is a public high school in Gnadenhutten, Ohio, United States. It is the only high school in the Indian Valley Local School District. Sports teams are called the Braves, and they compete in the Ohio High School Athletic Association as a member of the Inter-Valley Conference.

Indian Valley High School was formed when Indian Valley North High School in Midvale, Ohio consolidated with Indian Valley South High School.

OHSAA State Championships

 Boys Baseball - 2009
 Boys Basketball – 1972, 1976

Notable alumni
 Bob Huggins, basketball player (Indian Valley South)

References

External links
 District Website

High schools in Tuscarawas County, Ohio
Public high schools in Ohio